O. Henry's Full House is a 1952 American anthology film made by 20th Century Fox, consisting of five films, each based on a story by O. Henry.

The film was produced by André Hakim and directed by five directors from five screenplays with different authors. The music score was composed by Alfred Newman. The film is narrated by author John Steinbeck, who made his only on-camera appearance to introduce each story.

Plot

Prologue
A prologue presented by narrator John Steinbeck introduces biographic background on O. Henry and mentions several of his other stories not included, notably the story of reformed safecracker Jimmy Valentine in A Retrieved Reformation.

"The Cop and the Anthem"
Directed by Henry Koster, from a screenplay by Lamar Trotti, it stars  Charles Laughton, Marilyn Monroe and David Wayne. As winter approaches, a vagrant decides it's time for his annual winter spell in prison. But no matter how hard he tries, he cannot get himself arrested.

"The Clarion Call"
Directed by Henry Hathaway, from a screenplay by Richard L. Breen, it stars Dale Robertson and Richard Widmark. A detective cannot arrest a murderer he knows from his past due to his honor involving an outstanding financial debt to the criminal. Once a newspaper offers a reward, after being mocked by the criminal, the detective arrests the criminal and collects the reward to repay the debt.

This vignette reunited Henry Hathaway and Richard Widmark who'd worked together on the noir classic Kiss of Death (1947). Widmark's character in The Clarion Call, "Johnny Kernan", is actually a reprise of his Oscar-nominated character "Tommy Udo" from Kiss of Death.  Widmark's Udo/Kernan character was inspired by his love of Batman comics' "The Joker".  The Tommy Udo performance in turn influenced Frank Gorshin in preparation for his "Riddler" character on the Batman TV series in the 1960s.

"The Last Leaf"
Directed by Jean Negulesco, from a screenplay by Ivan Goff and Ben Roberts, it stars Anne Baxter, Jean Peters, and Gregory Ratoff. The story is set in Greenwich Village during the depths of winter. A poor old painter saves the life of a young woman, dying of pneumonia, by giving her the will to live. From her bed the patient can see an ivy vine through the window gradually losing its leaves in the intense cold.  She has taken it into her head that she will die when the vine loses its last leaf. Seemingly, the last leaf never falls, and the young woman survives. In reality, the vine lost all its leaves during the cold night. The leaf she thought she had seen was just the image of a leaf painted on the wall with perfect realism, by the old artist, who died of exposure in the cold shortly after finishing the painted leaf.

"The Ransom of Red Chief"
Directed by Howard Hawks, from a screenplay by Ben Hecht, Nunnally Johnson and Charles Lederer, it stars Fred Allen, Oscar Levant, Lee Aaker, Irving Bacon, Kathleen Freeman, and Robert Easton. Two con men kidnap a child in order to collect a substantial ransom, but the child proves to be too much for them.

"The Gift of the Magi"
Directed by Henry King, from a screenplay by Walter Bullock, it stars Jeanne Crain and Farley Granger. On Christmas Eve, with little money, Della sells her hair to buy her husband Jim a watch fob. Jim has sold his watch to buy her a pair of ornamental combs. When they exchange these now useless gifts, they realize how deep is their love for one another.

Cast

The Cop and the Anthem
 Charles Laughton as Soapy
 Marilyn Monroe as Streetwalker
 David Wayne as Horace

The Clarion Call
 Dale Robertson as Barney Woods 
 Richard Widmark as Johnny Kernan
 Richard Rober as Chief of Detectives
 House Peters as Dave Bascom

The Last Leaf
 Anne Baxter as Joanna Goodwin 
 Jean Peters as Susan Goodwin
 Gregory Ratoff as Behrman
 Richard Garrick as Doctor

The Ransom of Red Chief
 Fred Allen as Samuel Brown
 Oscar Levant as William Smith
 Lee Aaker as J.B. Dorset

The Gift of the Magi
 Jeanne Crain as Della Young
 Farley Granger as Jim Young
 Fred Kelsey as Mr. Schultz / Santa Claus

"The Ransom of Red Chief" 
When the film was first premiered in September 1952 in Los Angeles, it consisted of five parts, including Howard Hawks' "The Ransom of Red Chief".

The Hawks short was so poorly received that the studio removed it before the film opened in New York that October, leading some outlets to describe the film as O'Henry's Four of a Kind.

Eventually, "The Ransom of Red Chief" was reinstated, and is included on the DVD release.

See also
 List of Christmas films

References

External links
 
 
 
 
 
 Review at TimeOut Film
 Review at Channel 4 Film
 Review at Family Friendly Movies

1952 films
1950s Christmas films
1952 drama films
20th Century Fox films
American drama films
American Christmas films
American anthology films
American black-and-white films
1950s English-language films
Films scored by Alfred Newman
Films based on multiple works
Films based on short fiction
Films directed by Henry Koster
Films directed by Jean Negulesco
Films directed by Henry Hathaway
Films directed by Howard Hawks
Films directed by Henry King
Films with screenplays by Nunnally Johnson
Films with screenplays by Charles Lederer
Films with screenplays by Ben Hecht
Adaptations of works by O. Henry
1950s American films